Juliasdale is a resort town in Manicaland, Zimbabwe. It is situated in the foothills of the Nyanga mountains in eastern Zimbabwe

Location

The coordinates of Juliasdale are: 18° 22' 3.00"S, 32° 40' 48.00"E (Latitude:18.3675; Longitude:32.6800). Juliasdale is located in the Eastern Highlands, close to the international border with Mozambique. Its location lies within the confines of Nyanga National Park.

Overview
Juliasdale is home to the first casino in the country. The mountainous town is an attractive destination for tourism. Forestry and fruit are farmed in the region. ZB Bank Limited, a commercial bank, maintains a branch in the town.

Tourism
Located on the foothills of the Nyanga mountains, Juliasdale is surrounded by soaring mountains, crisp clean air and gentle streams, a number of charming country cottages and farms. Juliasdale attracts bird watchers, hikers, star gazers and fly fishing enthusiasts.  Wild trout and yellowfish are found in abundance in the streams and rivers in the area.

Population
The current population of Juliasdale is not publicly known. A national population census in Zimbabwe was scheduled from 18 August through 28 August 2012.

Geography

Climate
Juliasdale has a  temperate highland climate (Cwb, according to the Köppen climate classification), with mild summers and chilly, dry winters, with winter frosts.

See also
 Mount Nyangani
 Eastern Highlands
 Manyika people

External links
Location of Juliasdale At Google Maps

References

Populated places in Manicaland Province
Provincial capitals in Zimbabwe
Nyanga District